The 2019–20 Tahiti Ligue 2 was the second highest division of the Tahitian football league. The competition is organized and administered by  Fédération Tahitienne de Football.

Participating Teams

In the 2019–20 edition of the competition, 9 clubs were registered to play, however, only eight teams participated, after A.S. Vaiete withdrew.

AS Excelsior
AS Arue
Tefana B
AS Mataiea
AS Tamarii Punaruu
A.S. Taiarapu
A.S. Papenoo
A.S. Papara
A.S. Vaiete (withdrew)

Final classification

References

2